Francisco Cajigal de la Vega (sometimes spelled Francisco Caxigal de la Vega) (February 6, 1691, Ribamontán al Monte, Cantabria – 1777) was a Spanish military officer, governor of Cuba from 1747 to 1760, and interim viceroy of New Spain, from April 28, 1760 to October 5, 1760, succeeded by Viceroy Joaquín de Montserrat, marqués de Cruillas.

Cajigal was lieutenant general in the royal army and a knight of the Order of Santiago.  He was appointed as governor of Cuba in 1747.

He was governor of Cuba in 1760 at the time of the death of the previous viceroy, Agustín de Ahumada. The Audiencia possessed sealed orders to be opened on the death of Ahumada, and these named Cajigal to fill the position on an interim basis. He sailed from Havana for Veracruz on March 28, 1760. He remained in Veracruz a few days awaiting the arrival of the vehicle intended to take him to Mexico City. He made his solemn entry into Mexico City on April 28, 1760 and took up the government.

He worked to reform the accounting at the treasury. He removed the sales tax on products of iron and steel to stimulate construction and the mining of that metal. To augment revenue, he sold the monopoly on the production of playing cards and farmed out the collection of customs duties at Veracruz for five years. Other measures spurred the economy of La Florida and Panzacola (Pensacola).

He increased the regular army of New Spain to 2,921 men. He named his son, Juan Manuel, commander of the cavalry company of the viceregal guards.

On the ascension of Charles III to the Spanish throne, a general amnesty was declared. In New Spain, at least, it did not free many prisoners because there were many exceptions.

This viceroy was not considered very honorable. He insisted on a very high salary (at the rate of 40,000 pesos per year) and huge expenses for his return journey from Mexico to Havana (6,000 pesos).

He turned over the government of the colony to his successor, Joaquín de Montserrat, marqués de Cruillas on October 5, 1760 and returned to Havana, where he took up his old position.

References
 García Puron, Manuel, México y sus gobernantes, v. 1. Mexico City: Joaquín Porrua, 1984.
 Orozco Linares, Fernando, Gobernantes de México. Mexico City: Panorama Editorial, 1985, .

External links  

1691 births
1777 deaths
People from Trasmiera
Military personnel from Cantabria
Politicians from Cantabria
Viceroys of New Spain
Governors of Cuba
Spanish generals
Spanish colonial governors and administrators
Spanish colonial period of Cuba
Spanish West Indies
18th-century Cuban people